Propiverine is an anticholinergic drug used for the treatment of urinary urgency, frequency and urge incontinence, all symptoms of overactive bladder syndrome. It is a muscarinic antagonist. A modified release preparation is also available, taken once daily.

References 

Piperidines
Muscarinic antagonists
Ethers
Carboxylate esters